Gabriel Joubert Engelbrecht is a South African rugby union player for Spanish División de Honor de Rugby side Ordizia RE. His usual position is centre.

Career

References

1989 births
Living people
Afrikaner people
Free State Cheetahs players
Griffons (rugby union) players
Leopards (rugby union) players
Rugby union centres
Rugby union players from Kimberley, Northern Cape
South African people of Dutch descent
South African rugby union players